Andolsek is a surname. Notable people with the surname include:

Eric Andolsek (1966–1992), American football player
Eugene Andolsek (1921–2008), American draughtsman